{{Infobox College
|name                   = Madura State Polytechnic
|native_name            = Politeknik Negeri Madura
|image                  = File:Badge POLTERA.png
|image_size             = 200px
|caption                = the Seal of "POLTERA"
|motto                  = Quod Lux Clarior Futura
|mottoeng               = The Light of Brighter Future
|type                   = Polytechnic CollegePublic UniversityState UniversityEducational institutionResearch institution
|head_label             = Focused on
|head                   = Maritime transportMarine TechnologyOccupational safety and health
|free_label             = Established
|free                   =  as a polytechnic college of Madura
|free_label2            = Inaugurated 
|free2                  =  as a Madura State Polytechnic
|sports_free_label      = Executive board
|sports_free            = The BEM of PolteraPOLTERA TV
|sports_free_label2     = Activity units
|sports_free2           = 
 UKM of Nature lover
 UKM of Martial arts
 UKM of Badminton
 etc.
|academic_affiliations  = ✓ UNIPOLTECH association✓ PMDK Politeknik Negeri✓ Kemenristekdikti Indonesia
|president              =Dr. Arman Jaya
| city = Sampang
| province = East Java
| country = Indonesia
| address = Taddan Highway, Camplong
|campus                 = Rural
|website                = http://www.poltera.ac.id
|logo                   = Polteras Video Profile|colors                 = Red heart 
|athletics_nickname     = Blue Gears
Pride of Engineer
|coor                   = 
|footnotes              = 
}}

The Madura State Polytechnic was known in abbreviation as POLTERA , and formerly founded by Bina Sampang Mandiri (BSM) foundation in Madura island of Indonesia. The campus purposes to aim for the first Applied Technology model-based polytechnic college which is not similarly with Engineering model-based University. Since it was inaugurated as a state university as one of the well-known several polytechnics in East Java, which located in Sampang. Then previously founded in the year of 2012, the polytechnic is under the auspices of Ministry of Education (Kemendikbud). In the year of 2014, the auspices was replaced to the Ministry of Research, Technology and Higher Education (Kemenristekdikti). Poltera is not only educational role-model of engineering science in which was focussing towards maritime transport and marine technology as a kick-starter, but is also adopts model of industry-oriented education in tomorrow's engineer for the future of polytechnic (POLTECH).

Since 2012, Poltera was the first vocational education system in Madura. So, Poltera is located in Camplong by UTC+07:00 or West Indonesia Time (WIB), Province of East Java, which institution is equivalent to the university, especially the Institute of Technology. Poltera has been officially established to organizes academic and non-academic activities, as the initial pioneer with the coordination of two well-known institutions from Surabaya, such as the Electronic Engineering Polytechnic Institute of Surabaya (EEPIS) and the Shipbuilding Institute of Polytechnic Surabaya (SHIPS) as the temporary foundation for the readiness, towards establishment of an independent polytechnic college. For the constructions, lectures, academics and its facilities, in which explanation based on interview of first Director, Ir. Achmad Ansori, DEA. that in mid-2016, Poltera plans to utilize existing building facilities for lectures program of the only applied courses in Madura and as the flagship campus in Indonesia, especially Madura. In 2012, Poltera initially established a diploma-three of associate degree (D3) with a percentage of weight between practice and theory is 70% pre-industry in approach and 30% theory of application that can be reached normally with 6 semester (3 years). While going to the future, Poltera is plans to established a diploma-four of bachelor's degree (D4) which is equivalent to strata one of bachelor's degree (S1), the difference lies in the percentage of weight between research, rules, and regulations. Those are 40% of applied scientific and 60% scientific method that can be completed in the normal period for 8 semesters (4 years). Since establishment, the Union of polytechnic (UNIPOLTECH''') is an association of state polytechnic colleges in Indonesia (automatically), and Plotter Dies Natalis of birthday celebrations in which officially commemorated every 11 November by interval (born in 2012) of several achievement on progress.

 History 
 The Madura State Polytechnic Establishment in 2012 

The Polytechnic of Madura in establishment, the process was initially initiated by Yayasan Bina Sampang Mandiri (BSM), which was chaired by Ir. Mohammad Syaifurrahman Noer, he is more familiarly known by the nickname Cipung, son of H. Mohammad Noer, former Governor of East Java. It was greeted enthusiastically by the Regent of Sampang at that time. Furthermore, BSM Foundation in cooperation with the government of Sampang Regency realized the idea, and agreed to name the Polytechnic of Madura the so-called Poltera. The Ministry of Education and Culture (Mendikbud) Indonesia, Prof. Dr. Ir. H. Muhammad Nuh, DEA. (In the tenure of 22 October 2009 – 20 October 2014) has given a tremendous appreciation of the request for the establishment of the Madurese Polytechnic. During his visit to the location of the Madura Polytechnic campus on 12 May 2012, he said that the Madurese Polytechnic will directly become the State Polytechnic, said Mendikbud Indonesia at that time period which is the alma mater of the Sepuluh Nopember Institute of Technology also known as Institut Teknologi Sepuluh Nopember (ITS) in Surabaya, became the basic evidence of the seriousness of Kemendikbud of Indonesia in developing State Polytechnic in Madura. The establishment of Poltera aims to meet the needs of qualified human resources (Smart, Excellence, Dignity) for the industrial sector in which the graduates are prepared to become actors in development.

In accordance with the Presidential Regulation no. 10 Year 2016, Poltera is one of 35 colleges that have been established to become new public institutions. Most of these new state universities originally came from private universities. Poltera was established in 2012 on the initiative of BSM Foundation, and subsequently through Minister of Education Decree No. 67 of 2012 was confirmed to be a college.

 The Movement to a New Building and Started in 2016 
In the beginning of academic year of 2012/13, Poltera has three majors of study program: Industrial Electrical Technology, Heavy Industry Technology, and Shipbuilding Technology.
Total students amounted to 251 people, supported by 19 lecturers, and 13 staff formations of academic administration. Building facility that can be used for lecturing activities is a lecture building of Industrial Electrical Technology which consisting of three floors, and one building workshop of Building Engineering Department of Ship. However, Inspectorate II Team, inspector general of Kemenristekdikti RI, is assisted by Internal Supervisory Unit (SPI), M. Ishak, and Dr. Ir. I Made Gede Arimbawa, found that the facilities available still require improvement and refinement. Some notes from the review activities of the work payable in Poltera in 2016 dated 28 March – 1 April, among others, building hygiene, testing mechanical engineering facilities, safety equipment testing, roof leaks, roof work, still need to be done before delivery to the Poltera. The lecture facility of the Mechanical Engineering Department was still in the completion stage of three floors. At the end of 2016, Poltera plans to finish building completion of workshop, until now the construction of Poltera building is still ongoing as the improvement of facilities and infrastructure of advanced science education which is advanced and updated in technological development.

After merger in the academic year of 2018/2019, Poltera has four majors of study program by addition of Nursing Academy.

 The Merger of Nursing Academy Pamekasan in 2018 
Nursing academy of the Pamekasan district government was merged with Poltera, that is because a number of State Universities have merged with the campus owned by the Regional Government. This was done by the regional government under the pretext of Law 23 of 2014.

 Study Program 
 Diplôme of Strata-0 Degree 
Applied associate degree is expected to be a professional or energy-driven industrial-scale independent, applicative, and innovative. Polaris Diploma Program has been established since the establishment of Poltera, some of the study programs have been accredited and some are still in process.

 Baccalauréat of Strata-1 Degree 
Applied bachelor's degree is expected to be a leader in the field or industrial scale developers who are able to solve technical problems with certain methods and realize more efficient, effective, and advanced performance levels.

 Identity 
The Poltera symbol is in the shape of a dark blue tooth, five teeth, and in it are four white "P" letters that are interconnected to form a rhombus, in the middle there is a small white circle and the bottom of the gear is dark blue of "POLTERA" written symmetrical about the gears. The meaning of the symbol that the gear with the number of five teeth has a strong and dynamic meaning and brings the soul of Pancasila; four P letters that are interconnected means that the island of Madura which has a strong character, unites in independence, and determination to continue developing for the nation and state; and the four basic pillars connected to each other, namely the spirit of independence; human resources which include lecturers, students, and education personnel who have quality character and mindset; extensive network with business and industry at home and abroad; and good governance and encourage positive spirit. White circle means Poltera as the center of science and technology development. The writing "POLTERA" comes from the Madurese language which consists of the word "POL" has full meaning; and "TERA" has a light meaning; blue is a spectrum of calm, firm colors, and describes the extent of the sky and ocean; and the white color of the symbol means noble character and pure intentions towards the effort to achieve mutual glory.

 President of Madura State Polytechnic 
Below is a list of the Director of the State Polytechnic of Madura as a track record of the history of Poltera'', especially from its inception to the next in sustained leadership.

References

External links
University Website

Universities in Indonesia
Universities in East Java
Indonesian state universities
Universities and colleges in Indonesia